The Professional Squash Association, or PSA, was formed in 1975,  is the governing body for the men's and women's (since 2014) professional squash circuit. The previous women's squash tour were the Women's International Squash Players Association, or WISPA, between 1993 and 2011, follow by the Women's Squash Association between 2011 and 2014.

These are some of the important PSA records since the inception in 1975 (1993 for women).

Tour Titles Records

All Tournament

Men

Women

As of August 15th, 2015

World Series Tournament

Men

Women

As of August 15th, 2015

Youngest Tour Winners

All Tournament

Men

Women

As of August 15th, 2015

Oldest Tour Winners

All Tournament

Men

Women

As of August 15th, 2015

See also
Squash
PSA World Tour

References

External links
SquashInfo Records Page

Squash records and statistics